Tennis events were contested at the 1973 Summer Universiade in Moscow, Soviet Union.

Medal summary

Medal table

See also
 Tennis at the Summer Universiade

External links
World University Games Tennis on HickokSports.com

1973
Universiade
1973 Summer Universiade
Tennis tournaments in Russia